An itinerant is a person who travels habitually. Itinerant may refer to:
"Travellers" or itinerant groups in Europe
Itinerant preacher, also known as itinerant minister
Travelling salespeople, see door-to-door, hawker, and peddler
Travelling showpeople, see Carny (US), Showmen (UK)
The Peredvizhniki or Itinerants, a school of nineteenth-century Russian painters
Vagrancy (people)
People experiencing long-term homelessness
Mendicant
Eyre (legal term) or "itinerant justice"
Justice in Eyre
"Itinerant court" of Charlemagne (and later Carolingian emperors), see Government of the Carolingian Empire
 Migrant worker

See also
Nomadism (habitual travelling for pasture)
Transhumance
Gypsy (term)
Gypsy (disambiguation)